Tanyaradzwa is a 2005 Zimbabwean award-winning bilingual drama film written and directed by Tawanda Gunda Mupengo. The film stars Tongayi Chirisa, Kudakwashe Maradzika and Tendai Musoni in the lead roles. The titular role is played by the lead actress Kudakwashe Maradzika. The film had its theatrical release in August 2005 and received positive reviews. It also received several awards and nominations.

Cast 

 Tongayi Chirisa
 Kudakwashe Maradzika
 Tendai Musoni
 Chamu Rice
 Tafadzwa Munyoro
 Rukudzo Chadzamira
 Emmanuel Mbirirmi
 Agnes Mupikata

Plot 
Tanyaradzwa (Kudakwashe Maradzika), an intelligent and charming 18 year old teenage girl who hails from a well to do family becomes pregnant at school and was guilty of preserving the secret of her pregnancy from her parents for nine months. She gives birth to a baby boy and after getting to know this, her parents feel ashamed and chases her away. Tanya then attempts to find the baby's father.

Awards and nominations 
The film was nominated in six categories at the 2006 Africa Movie Academy Awards and won the Award for the Best Cinematography and Tendai Musoni received the Award for Most Promising Actress.

References

External links 

 

2005 films
Zimbabwean drama films
Shona-language films
2000s English-language films